Frank Kuenstler (1928–1996) was a New York poet and filmmaker. His work appeared in The Nation, the Village Voice, Film Culture, and in such anthologies as Mixed Voices and America: A Prophecy. Lens first appeared in Film Culture No. 33 (Summer 1964). He taught at the School of Visual Arts, edited Bread and Airplane, and was one of the animating spirits of Eventorium, an arts collective on Manhattan’s upper west side.

Audio tapes of two readings can be heard at PennSound . Anthology Film Archives houses the archive of films.

His last two books, In Which and The Seafarer, B.Q.E., and Other Poems, are available from Cairn Editions.

Literary works
Lens (1964)
Selected Poems (1964)
Paradise News (1966)
Fugitives. Rounds (1966)
13½ Poems (1984)
Continued (1987)
Miscellany (1987)
In Which (1994)
The Seafarer, B.Q.E., and Other Poems (1996)

Film works
His films include 
Color Idioms
El Atlantis

References

External links
 His obituary in the New York Times
 Another obituary
 http://muse.jhu.edu/login?uri=/journals/contemporary_literature/v045/45.3heuving.pdf
 https://web.archive.org/web/20110611172208/http://www.milkmag.org/milkinfo.pdf
 http://www.thenation.com/authors/frank-kuenstler
 http://writing.upenn.edu/pennsound/x/Kuenstler.php
 http://eclipsearchive.org/projects/LENS/Lens.pdf

1928 births
1996 deaths
20th-century American poets